KEWB (94.7 MHz, "Power 94-7") is a commercial FM radio station in Anderson, California, broadcasting to the Northern California area. KEWB airs a Top 40 (CHR) music format, which it has had from 1983 until 1993 and again since 1999.

Station History
From its inception on March 20, 1983, until 1993, they were a Top 40/CHR station as "B94". It would be later known as"B-94.7" and "The Killer Bee". In 1991-92, B-94.7 featured Coy & Company in the morning, Wild Bill Shakespeare in the afternoon drive, and "Hojo" -Howard Johnson, nights. From 1993 to 1999, it was a country station called B-94.7. After 6 years as a country station, KEWB became (Power 94) in 1999.

On February 23, 2011, KEWB's sister station in Chico, California, KCEZ changed formats from oldies to top 40, branded as "Power 102.1". The station's direction is patterned after KEWB.

References

External links
KEWB official website

EWB
Rhythmic contemporary radio stations in the United States
Contemporary hit radio stations in the United States
Radio stations established in 1983